The 1922 New York state election was held on November 7, 1922, to elect the governor, the lieutenant governor, the Secretary of State, the state comptroller, the attorney general, the state treasurer, the state engineer and a U.S. Senator, as well as all members of the New York State Assembly and the New York State Senate. Two amendments to the State Constitution were also proposed. During his 1922 reelection bid, Smith notably embraced his position as an opponent of Prohibition.

History
A Socialist state convention met on July 2 at 5, East Sixteenth Street in New York City. They nominated a tentative ticket which would be the basis for a fusion with the Farmer-Labor Party to be effected later. On it were Ex-Alderman Edward F. Cassidy for governor; Theresa B. Wiley, of Schenectady, for lieutenant governor; A. Philip Randolph for secretary of state; James C. Sheahan, a railroad worker of Albany, for comptroller; Morris Berman for treasurer; Hezekiah D. Wilcox for attorney general; Charles P. Steinmetz for state engineer; and John W. Dannes, of Rochester, for U.S. Senator. The official state convention met on September 30 at 7 East Fifteenth Street in New York City; S. John Block was chairman. They nominated the same state ticket which was already proposed in July, with one exception. For U.S. Senator, Mrs. Esther Lefkowitz, of Elmhurst was nominated.

The Republican state convention met on September 28 in Albany, New York. Elihu Root was temporary chairman until the choice of Speaker H. Edmund Machold as permanent chairman. All nominations, except for secretary of state, were unopposed. Governor Nathan L. Miller was re-nominated. William J. Donovan was nominated for lieutenant governor. Secretary of State John J. Lyons was defeated on the first ballot by Samuel J. Joseph, of The Bronx (vote: Joseph 1031, Lyons 158). The incumbents Comptroller William J. Maier, Treasurer N. Monroe Marshall and U.S. Senator William M. Calder were re-nominated. Superintendent of Public Works Charles L. Cadle, of Rochester, was nominated for state engineer; and Erskine C. Rogers, of Hudson Falls, for attorney general.

The Democratic state convention met on September 29 in Syracuse, New York. Mayor of Albany William S. Hackett was permanent chairman. Ex-Governor Al Smith (in office 1919-20) was nominated again for governor, all 734 votes were cast for him, the only candidate. Mayor of Schenectady George R. Lunn was nominated for lieutenant governor; New York City Commissioner of Corrections James A. Hamilton for secretary of state; Ex-Mayor of Troy James W. Fleming for comptroller, Captain George K. Shuler for treasurer; Assistant U.S. Attorney for the Western District of New York Carl Sherman for attorney general; Dwight B. LaDu for state engineer; and New York City Health Commissioner Dr. Royal S. Copeland for U.S. Senator. All nominations were unopposed.

Result
The whole Democratic ticket was elected.

The incumbents Miller, Maier, Marshall and Calder were defeated.

The Democratic, Republican and Socialist parties maintained automatic ballot access (necessary 15,000 votes for governor), the Farmer-Labor and Prohibition parties lost it; and the Socialist Labor Party did not re-attain it.

Amendments
The amendment proposing to increase the salaries of the judges of the New York Court of Appeals from $10,000 to $17,000 was rejected: 572,502 For and 891,980 Against.
The amendment proposing a change in the procedure relating to special city bills was accepted: 819,628 For and 554,654 Against.

Notes

References

Sources
The tickets: "Aspirants Seeking Office Next Tuesday". The New York Times. November 5, 1922.
Result: "Smith Plurality Fixed at 385,945". The New York Times. December 8, 1922.
Result (Prohibition only): Vote for Prohibition candidates at Prohibitionists.org
 Results, New York Red Book 1923

See also
New York gubernatorial elections
New York state elections

1922